"Guardian Angel" is a 1983 song by Drafi Deutscher under the pen name Masquerade. German and Italian cover versions, named "Jenseits von Eden" and "La valle dell'Eden" respectively, were released by Nino de Angelo in the same year.

History 
The song was originally released by Drafi Deutscher under the pen name Masquerade. It charted in Germany as well as in several other nations and is the second most famous song by Deutscher after "Marmor, Stein und Eisen bricht" (engl. Marble, Stone and Iron Breaks). In the UK, the song was released in a version sung by Nino de Angelo who had also recorded German and Italian covers (see below). De Angelo's version reached number 57 on the UK Singles Chart.

Music video 
Numerous European TV-show appearances of Masquerade were used as separate music videos for the song. The hitmusic television-show was called Eldorado and the video featured two men in white makeup lip synching to Deutscher's vocals.

Track listings 
12" Single
 Guardian Angel 5:10	
 Silent Echos Of Katja 3:57

7" Single
 Guardian Angel 4:30	
 Silent Echos Of Katja 3:57

Charts 

Drafi Deutscher released the German version of the song—"Jenseits von Eden"— on his greatest hits collection Diesmal für immer in 1987.

Nino de Angelo versions 

In the same year, German singer Nino de Angelo released a German-language version called "Jenseits von Eden" ("East of Eden") as well as an album with the same name. There was also an Italian-language version of the song, which – due to a mistake – originally had the Spanish name La valle del Edén. In 1984, the Italian title was changed to the correct La valle dell'Eden.

Track listings 
7" Single
 Jenseits von Eden 3:50	
 Silbermond 3:20

Charts

Certifications

References 

1983 singles
Songs written by Drafi Deutscher
1983 songs
London Records singles
Songs written by Joachim Horn-Bernges